Arthur Lewis Baker (8 January 1894 – March 1972) was an English professional footballer who played in the Football League for Brentford as an outside left.

Career 
A Royal Navy regular with no experience of professional football, Baker signed for London Combination club Brentford in the autumn of 1918. His performances on the wing were such that he forced cricket/football star Patsy Hendren to switch to the other flank in order to stay in the team. Baker was a part of the team which won the London Combination title in the 1918–19 season, but his Navy duties took him away from Griffin Park after the season. Baker re-registered with Brentford on 15 October 1920, during the club's first season in the Football League. He made four appearances, but the club declined to buy him out of the Navy. He transferred to First Division club Manchester City in February 1920, but failed to make an appearance. Baker dropped into non-League football to sign for Athenian League club Hampstead Town briefly in 1922.

Personal life 
Baker joined the Royal Navy prior to the First World War.

Honours 
Brentford
 London Combination: 1918–19

Career statistics

References

1894 births
English footballers
Footballers from Plumstead
Brentford F.C. players
English Football League players
Hendon F.C. players
1972 deaths
Association football outside forwards
Royal Navy personnel of World War I